Lonesome Jim is a 2005 American comedy/drama film directed by actor/filmmaker Steve Buscemi. Filmed mostly in the city of Goshen, Indiana, the film stars Casey Affleck as a chronically depressed aspiring writer who moves back into his parents' home after failing to make it in New York City. His older brother (Kevin Corrigan) already lives there with his two daughters.  Liv Tyler stars as a good-hearted nurse who begins a sexual relationship with Jim and starts to see him as a potential stepfather for her son.

Lonesome Jim premiered at the 2005 Sundance Film Festival, where it was nominated for the Grand Jury Prize, but it lost to Ira Sachs' Forty Shades of Blue.  The screenplay was based on characters and events in author Jim Strouse's life. The entire film was shot on a mini-DV digital video camera instead of actual film.

Plot
Jim (Casey Affleck) is a perennially gloomy 27-year-old aspiring writer from Goshen, Indiana who had moved to NYC in hopes of finding success with his writing. After two years of barely making a living as a dog walker, he decides to move back home to his parents' house in Goshen.

Jim's 32-year-old brother Tim (Kevin Corrigan), a recently divorced father of two young girls whose business recently failed, has moved back into his parents' home. He works in the ladder factory that's owned and operated by their father Don (Seymour Cassel) and cheerful mother Sally (Mary Kay Place). Jim has no interest in the family business and he resists pressure to start working there.

Jim meets Anika (Liv Tyler), a nurse, in a bar and they end up having sex in a hospital bed, and Jim finishes almost immediately.

After a conversation between the two brothers on whose life is more pathetic, Tim, having previously made repeated unsuccessful attempts to commit suicide, drives his car into a tree. He is gravely injured, in a coma, and hospitalized. Jim finally gives in to Don and works in the factory by taking over Tim's duties. He also takes over Tim's job as the coach of a girls basketball team. The team, which has not scored a single point in the last 14 games, includes both of Tim's daughters.

While visiting Tim is in the hospital, Jim runs into Anika, who works in pediatrics.  They arrange a date, but on arriving to pick her up, he discovers she is a single mother.  Their relationship progresses, however.  Anika is sympathetic to Jim's problems, and she decides to stand by him even when he tries to convince her that it's in her best interest to not be around him.

At the ladder factory, Jim encounters his uncle Stacy or "Stace" (Mark Boone Junior), who prefers "Evil."  Over a joint, Evil offers advice about premature ejaculation, and they become better acquainted. He offers Jim recreational drugs and asks him to open him a checking account so he can pay for things by mail.  Evil gives Jim $4,000, saying it is saved-up birthday, Christmas and graduation presents.

Jim's mother, Sally, is arrested by DEA officers for allegedly shipping illegal drugs through the store's FedEx account. Evil is the drug dealer, but Jim cannot get him to confess. Evil points out that Jim will be implicated if he tries to report him, as he has opened an account with his cash and will test positive for drug use. An eternal optimist, Sally makes friends with her fellow prisoners and accepts a novel from Jim when he visits. Eventually she is released on bail.

Despite working at the factory and feeling responsible for his mother's imprisonment, Jim allows Anika to soften his depression and starts believing that life is worth living. He invites her and her son to move with him to New Orleans, but after Jim gets cold feet and makes a questionable decision, the move seems to be off the table.

Jim finally leaves for New Orleans alone, leaving a note for his parents promising not to take their love for granted again and revealing Evil as the drug dealer. Anika shows up at the bus station to say goodbye. Jim departs on the bus, but as Anika drives home with her son, he runs after them, luggage in hand. He asks "for a ride" and the movie ends with Jim, out-of-breath, finally getting a bottle of water from Ben in the back seat.

Cast
 Casey Affleck as Jim
 Liv Tyler as Anika
 Kevin Corrigan as Tim
 Mary Kay Place as Sally
 Seymour Cassel as Don
 Mark Boone Junior as Stacy a.k.a. "Evil"
 Jack Rovello as Ben

Production
The film was originally a part of a deal with Universal Studios and had a proposed budget of $3 million. However, the deal with Universal was unexpectedly cancelled and Lonesome Jim then ended up being shot and produced on a meager budget of $500,000 with the original filming schedule being reduced from 30 down to 17 days. As a cost-saving measure, screenplay writer James C. Strouse, a native of Goshen, Indiana, employed two of his nieces as actors in the film, another family member as location manager, as well he used his parents' home and factory as a location for Jim's parents' home and factory. More money was saved by recording the entire film onto a mini-DV digital video camera rather than a film camera.

Critical reception and box office
During its theatrical run, Lonesome Jim never earned back its initial budget of $500,000; instead, the film grossed less than $155,000 domestically and less than $175,000 worldwide.

The film received mixed reaction from film critics. The aggregate review websites Rotten Tomatoes and Metacritic record a rating of 60% and 54/100 respectively as of October 28, 2008. Film critic Roger Ebert of the Chicago Sun-Times awarded the film three stars out of four, and it also received "Two thumbs up" on the film review television program At the Movies with Ebert & Roeper co-hosted by Richard Roeper. Mathew Turner of View London proclaimed "Lonesome Jim is one of the year's best films, thanks to a superb script, terrific performances and Buscemi's assured direction".
Peter Travers of Rolling Stone awarded it three stars out of four, calling the film a "deadpan delight" and proclaiming "I can't recall having a better time at a movie about depression". Critic Christopher Campbell declared the film "hilarious throughout. By far it is the funniest thing I saw during the [Sundance film] festival".

On the other hand, there were a number of unfavorable reviews.  Stephen Holden of The New York Times did not give the film a very favorable review, criticizing the film's sense of humor by calling it "only as broad as the Mona Lisa's smile" and criticizing Affleck's portrayal of Jim. Lisa Schwarzbaum of Entertainment Weekly awarded the film a grade of C-, writing that director Steve Buscemi "is stymied here by the inertia of his material".

See also

 Cinema of the United States
 List of American films of 2005

References

External links
 
 
 
 
 

2005 films
2005 comedy-drama films
2005 independent films
American comedy-drama films
American independent films
Films about depression
Films set in Indiana
Films shot in Indiana
Films directed by Steve Buscemi
2000s English-language films
2000s American films